John Lawrence Schroeder (born November 12, 1945) is an American professional golfer who played on the PGA Tour and Champions Tour.

Schroeder was born in Great Barrington, Massachusetts, the son of tennis great Ted Schroeder. He attended the University of Michigan and was a member of the golf team, an All-American in 1968. He turned pro in 1969.

Schroeder had 35 top-10 finishes in PGA Tour events including a win at the 1973 U.S. Professional Match Play Championship. In the middle of his tour career he also had some success in Europe. He led the 1977 Open Championship after the first round and wound up in a tie for 9th. His good play in Europe continued the following week at the Swiss Open where he finished runner-up to Seve Ballesteros. He recorded another top-10 at the 1978 Open Championship. He finished the 1979 Bay Hill Citrus Classic tied for first in regulation play; however, he lost in a playoff to Bob Byman. He recorded T-4 place finish at the 1981 U.S. Open, his best finish ever in a major championship. He did not play full-time on the PGA Tour after the 1982 season.

Schroeder spent most of his late thirties and forties working as an on-course reporter and analyst for ABC Sports, ESPN and NBC Sports.

Shortly before he turned 49 he played some on the PGA Tour and Nike Tour to prepare for the Champions Tour. He played in six PGA Tour events and nine Nike Tour events. His best finish was a solo 5th in the 1995 Nike Utah Classic. He joined the Champions Tour in 1996. In 2001, Schroeder won the NFL Golf Classic and the Champions Tour Comeback Player of the Year award.

Schroeder achieved great financial success as one of the original owners of Cobra Golf. He was inducted into the University of Michigan Athletic Hall of Honor in 1992, and makes his home in Del Mar, California.

Professional wins (3)

PGA Tour wins (1)

PGA Tour playoff record (0–1)

Other wins (1)
1981 Rover Open (France)

Senior PGA Tour wins (1)

Senior PGA Tour playoff record (1–1)

Results in major championships

CUT = missed the half-way cut
"T" = tied

See also
Spring 1969 PGA Tour Qualifying School graduates
University of Michigan Athletic Hall of Honor

References

External links

American male golfers
Michigan Wolverines men's golfers
PGA Tour golfers
PGA Tour Champions golfers
Golf writers and broadcasters
Golfers from Massachusetts
Golfers from California
People from Great Barrington, Massachusetts
Sportspeople from Berkshire County, Massachusetts
People from Del Mar, California
1945 births
Living people
20th-century American people